Vaison Cathedral, dedicated to Our Lady of Nazareth, is a Roman Catholic church and one of the two former cathedrals in Vaison-la-Romaine, France. It was formerly the seat of the Bishopric of Vaison, abolished under the Concordat of 1801.

The structure of the cathedral in general is Romanesque and dates from the 11th century, but the apse and the apsidal chapels are from the Merovingian period.

The second former cathedral of Vaison is the Cathedral of the Assumption, also known as the  because of its location on the top of the mount inside the city walls. It was built some centuries later than the other cathedral, for greater security in disturbed times.

References

Further reading
 L.-H. Labande, La cathédrale de Vaison. Étude historique et archéologique, Bulletin Monumental de la Société française d'archéologie, tome 69, 1905, p. 254 (online version)
 Catholic Encyclopaedia: Diocese of Vaison

Vaison
Romanesque architecture in France
Churches in Vaucluse